George Albert Hammes (September 11, 1911 – April 11, 1993) was an American bishop in the Roman Catholic Church. He served as Bishop of Superior from 1960 to 1985.

Biography
Born in St. Joseph, Wisconsin, Hammes was ordained to the priesthood for the Roman Catholic Diocese of La Crosse on May 22, 1937, at the Cathedral of St. Joseph the Workman. He served as secretary to Bishop Alexander McGavick and taught religion at Aquinas High School in La Crosse, Wisconsin. He then served as pastor of St. Leo Parish in West Salem, Wisconsin. In 1960, Hammes was appointed bishop of the Roman Catholic Diocese of Superior and was ordained bishop on May 24, 1960, in La Crosse, Wisconsin. In 1985, Hammes retired; he died at a rest home in La Crosse, Wisconsin.

See also
 Catholic Church hierarchy
 Catholic Church in the United States
 Historical list of the Catholic bishops of the United States
 List of Catholic bishops of the United States
 Lists of patriarchs, archbishops, and bishops

References

Sources
 Fisher, Gerald Edward. Dusk is My Dawn:The First Hundred Years of the Diocese of La Crosse. La Crosse, Wis.: Diocese of La Crosse, 1969, p. 160.
 "Msgr. Hammes Bishop-Elect of Superior". Aquinas News, La Crosse, Wisconsin, April 29, 1960, vol. 29, no. 8, p. 1.

External links
 Diocese of Superior

Participants in the Second Vatican Council
1911 births
1993 deaths
20th-century Roman Catholic bishops in the United States
Burials in Wisconsin
People from La Crosse County, Wisconsin
Religious leaders from Wisconsin
Roman Catholic bishops of Superior
Roman Catholic Diocese of La Crosse